Stavča Vas is a village on the right bank of the Krka River in the Municipality of Žužemberk in southeastern Slovenia. The area is part of the historical region of Lower Carniola. The municipality is now included in the Southeast Slovenia Statistical Region. The settlement includes the formerly independent village of Cegelnica.

Church

The local church is dedicated to Saint Cantius and belongs to the Parish of Žužemberk. It is a medieval building that was restyled in the Baroque style in the 18th century, when a new belfry was also built.

References

External links

Stavča Vas at Geopedia
Stavča Vas sports club

Populated places in the Municipality of Žužemberk